Woven Planet Holdings, Inc., a subsidiary of the Toyota Motor Corporation, was formerly the Toyota Research Institute – Advanced Development (TRI–AD), which had been established by Toyota in 2018.  In 2021 it became Woven Planet Holdings, with two subsidiary companies, Woven Core and Woven Alpha, as well as an investment fund, Woven Capital.

Description 
Woven Planet Holdings incorporated in January 2021, organizing at that time the two subsidiaries Woven Core and Woven Alpha, and also creating the fund, Woven Capital. Woven Planet Holdings, Inc., develops and maintains automotive software products and technologies in Japan. Woven Planet Holdings CEO James Kuffner said, "Toyota's traditional strength in hardware is something we never want to lose. To make safe mobility we need both, great hardware and great software... The automotive industry is going through this once-in-a-hundred-year revolution... Some things we're going to do are going to fail. But, as I always tell my team, it isn't a failure if you learn. We are always going to be learning, in the spirit of 'kaizen' and improvement."

Woven Core 
The subsidiary Woven Core will "develop, implement and scale automated driving technologies".

Woven Alpha 
The subsidiary Woven Alpha's mission is to search out new business opportunities and incubate new projects like Woven City, the autonomous vehicle software, and an automated mapping platform.

Woven Capital 
In 2021, Toyota Research Institute – Advanced Development set up the US$800m (€676m) global investment fund, Woven Capital, to support the work of Woven Core and Woven Alpha. The fund is for investment in driverless car technologies, including "autonomous mobility, automation, artificial intelligence, machine learning, data and analytics, connectivity, and smart cities".

History 
TRI–AD began in 2018, a joint venture among Toyota, Denso, and Aisin to unify and strengthen Toyota's software for automated driving and safety. In January 2021, it became Woven Planet Holdings.

In April 2021, Woven Planet Holdings agreed to acquire Lyft's Level 5 self-driving vehicle division. Financing included US$550 million in cash with $200 million paid upfront and $350 million of payments over five year period. Woven Planet CEO James Kuffner said the acquisition assembled "a dream team of world-class engineers and scientists to deliver safe mobility technology for the world".

Woven Planet also acquired CARMERA, Inc., in July 2021. CARMERA "specializes in sophisticated road mapping updates made cheaper and faster by using crowdsourced information obtained in real time from millions of net-connected Toyota vehicles".

In September 2021, Woven Planet acquired Renovo Motors, Inc., a Silicon Valley automotive operating system developer.

See also
 Artificial intelligence
 Automobile safety
 Automotive navigation system
 Autopilot
 Advanced Driver Assistance Systems
 Connected car
 Hybrid navigation
 List of self-driving system suppliers
 Mobility as a service (transport)
 Smart camera
 Vehicle infrastructure integration
 Vehicle safety technology
 Woven City

References

External links 

Japanese brands
Japanese companies established in 2018
Robotics companies of Japan
Technology companies established in 2018
Toyota subsidiaries